Palliveettil  Chandy also known as Parambil  Chandy (Alexander de Campo in Portuguese)  was a bishop of the Catholic Saint Thomas Christians. He is also the first known native Indian bishop. He was the bishop of the East Syriac Rite (Chaldaean) faction (also known as the Palayakūttukar, or "Old Allegiance") after the Coonan Cross Oath in 1653. This faction returned to full communion with the Holy See of Rome, it would later become known as the modern-day Eastern Catholic Syro-Malabar Church. Mar Chandy's tomb is at the Marth Mariam Major Archiepiscopal Church at Kuravilangad.

Palliveettil Chandy was appointed as a bishop when the community was divided under the Portuguese Padroado and  Thoma I, who was the then leader of the Puthenkūttukar. At first Palliveettil  Chandy was the Counsellor of Thoma I. He had an instrumental role in the bishopric ascention of Archdeacon Parambil Thoma as Bishop Thoma I.   According to Portuguese and Jesuit reports, Chandy had defected with Thomas deCampo (Archdeacon Parambil Thoma), against Francis Garcia, the Archbishop of Cranganore.

There was a plan to appoint Archdeacon Giwargis of Christ, by Abraham of Angamaly (1568–1597) as Metropolitan of India. Thus Giwargis should have become, according to the plans of Abraham, supported by the Jesuits, the first indigenous Chaldaean Metropolitan of the St Thomas Christians. However, from the last letter of Abraham, where he requests the Pope to confirm the archdeacon's election as Bishop of Palayur and his successor, is dated 13 January 1584, while from another letter of the same Abraham we learn that the consecration of the archdeacon failed because of the latter's death.

Palliveettil Chandy had an instrumental role in claiming eighty-four churches onto the Catholic side after the Coonan Cross Oath. After his death from 1678 till 1783 there were no native Bishops in the Catholic faction known as Pazhayakūr of the Saint Thomas Christians. His cousin Parambil Thoma, was elevated as a bishop by 12 priests following the Coonan Cross Oath in 1653. In 1665 Gregorios Abdul Jaleel, said to be a delegate of the Patriarch of Antioch (of the Syriac Orthodox Church), regularized the consecration of Thoma who would form the West Syriac oriented Malankara Church Puthenkūr.

Introduction

Historically Saint Thomas Christians were part of East Syriac Church. They came into direct communion with the Church of Rome through the Chaldean Patriarchate with the arrival of Metropolitan Mar Joseph Sulaqa and patriarchal delegate Mar Elias in AD 1554. Historically, the title of the head of the Church of Saint Thomas was the 'Metropolitan and the Gate of India'. Ancient documents vouches this.

After the Synod of Diamper in 1599, the Church of Saint Thomas Christians became subjected to Latin Church Bishops. The Latin missionaries broke the historic connection of Thomas Christians with the Patriarch of Babylon and downgraded the ancient Church of Christians of Saint Thomas into a mere suffragan of the archdiocese of Goa of the Latin Church. Later, the Metropolitanate was reinstated and the Archdiocese of Angamaly was renamed as Archdiocese of Kodungalloor and its seat moved to Kodungalloor with Latin Prelates.

Even though the Thomas Christians were subjected to Latin Church prelates in the hierarchy, the community consolidated under the leadership of the Archdeacons as a separate rite with its own liturgy and traditions. The Missionaries began to impose Latinisations in their rite of worship and tried to eliminate the authority and status of the Archdeaconate and thereby dishonour the status of their ancient Church of Malabar. The community secretly tried to get prelates from the Patriarchate of the Chaldeans and the  Patriarchate of the Assyrians.

The missionaries used their political power to prevent Thomas Christians from contacting with any Oriental Churches and they even arrested and deported Ahatalla, a bishop of West Syriac Rite arrived in Mailappore. Thomas Christians rose up and revolted against the Portuguese in AD 1653 and consecrated (invalidly) the Archdeacon Parambil Thoma as the Bishop of Thomas Christians. This revolt was nearly complete and that changed the politics.

A protest took place in 1653 with the Coonan Cross Oath. Under the leadership of Archdeacon Thomas, the Thomas Christians publicly took an oath that they would not obey the Jesuit bishops. There are various versions about the wording of oath, one version being that the oath was directed against the Portuguese, another that it was directed against Jesuits, yet another version that it was directed against the authority of the Church of Rome However, after this oath, Saint Thomas Christans elevated Archdeacon Thomas to Metropolitan by the laying on of hands by twelve kattanars and he took the title Mar Thoma I

At this point of time, Rome intervened and Carmelite Missionaries were sent to win the Thomas Christians back. Carmelites could convince the majority that the local church needs bishops and the consecration of the Archdeacon Thomas was claimed to be  invalid as the consecration was conducted not by any bishop, but by twelve priests. Many leaders of the community rejoined the missionaries and later, due to political reasons, Portuguese Missionaries had to leave the country and they consecrated Palliveettil Chandy kathanaar as the Bishop for the Catholic Thomas Christians on 1 February 1663. This resulted in the first split in the  history of Thomas Christians. Thus, Mar Thoma I and Mar Chandy from the same family (Pakalomattom) became rival bishops in Thomas Christians community and both of them designated themselves as ‘Metran of All India’, and ‘Gate of India’.  However, Mar Chandy could convince a good number of people in his favor, because the Mar Thoma I was consecrated by priests whereas he was consecrated by an authoritative bishop. The faction affiliated with the Catholic Church under Palliveettil Chandy, referred themselves as Pazhayakuttukar , or "Old Allegiance", and called the branch affiliated with Thoma I as Puthankuttukar, or "New Allegiance". Later Thoma I, received canonical consecration from Gregorios Abdal Jaleel, a bishop sent by the Syrian Orthodox Patriarch of Antioch, and there by Puthenkūr faction entered in spiritual relation with the Syriac Orthodox Church, a miaphysite West Syriac Church.

Early life and ordination

He belonged to the Palliveettil house of Pakalomattam family at Muttuchira.  The Palliveettil building of Parambrem Kara existed there till two centuries back. Palliveettil Kuriakose married into Kudukkasserry and the son born to the couple later became the Bishop. "Alexander De Campo" is a Portuguese designation translated as "Alexander of the field" originating from "Parambil Chandy" in vernacular Malayalam. He was Vicar of Kuravilangad Parish and later had Kuravilangad as his headquarters.

He was a native of Muttuchira parish, in the present central Kerala. As a priest his original name was Father Parambil Chandy. He was consecrated Titular Bishop of Megara in Achala and Vicar Apostolic and Administrator of the Archbishopric of Cranganore on 31 January 1663, at Kaduthuruthy. He celebrated his first pontifical mass at Muttuchira Church. His appointment followed representations for the appointment of native Indians as bishops following the split in the church on account of the Coonan Cross Oath. His official title was Metropolitan and Gate of All India.

Later years and death
In 1674, Palliveetil Chandy requested Rome to elect a coadjutor and proposed his nephew, Mathew Kunnel for the position. Carmelites arrived in India in 1676, with special Dutch passports (as Dutch wouldn't allow any other European to work in their areas) and they were asked by Rome to elect an Indian. They elected Raphael Figueredo in 1677, who was not a Roman Syrian Catholic but born as an Indian in the sense that he was a half caste Portuguese. This election shook the confidence  Roman faction had in Carmelites and quarrels started to arise. Palliveettil Chandy died in 1687 and was buried at  Kuravilangad.

See also 
 Kadavil Chandy Kathanar
 Syro-Malabar Catholic Church
 List of Syro-Malabar Catholics
 Timeline of the Syro-Malabar Catholic Church
 Christianity in India
 Saint Thomas Christians

External links 
 Mar Chandy Parambil
 St Thomas Christian Encyclopaedia of India - Edited by George Menachery (1998).
 History of Christianity in India - Mundadan, A. Mathias (1984).

References

Syro-Malabar Catholics
Christian clergy from Thrissur
Year of birth missing
1687 deaths
17th-century Eastern Catholic bishops
17th-century Indian scholars